Schistopterum is a genus of tephritid  or fruit flies in the family Tephritidae.

Species
Schistopterum ismayi Hardy, 1982
Schistopterum longulum Munro, 1937
Schistopterum moebiusi Becker, 1903

References

Tephritinae
Tephritidae genera
Taxa named by Theodor Becker